The Billboard Latin Music Hall of Fame is a rarely presented honor presented by American magazine Billboard at the Billboard Latin Music Awards. The accolade was established in 1994 to recognize "artists who have achieved worldwide recognition for their work, transcending musical genres and languages". This includes artists who laid the "artistic foundation" for contemporary Latin music. Potential recipients are nominated by Billboards editorial committee, which decides the merit of each nominee with regards to their contribution to Latin music. Artists chosen to be inducted into the Latin Music Hall of Fame include individuals who exemplify Latin music, are pivotal or iconic pioneers, and whose works are a developmental milestone in the Latin music industry.

Cuban musicians Celia Cruz and Cachao were the first artists to be inducted into the Latin Music Hall of Fame at the inaugural Billboard Latin Music Awards in 1994. Selena and Raúl Alarcón, Sr. are the only recipients to have been inducted posthumously in 1995 and 2009, respectively. Selena was named "Hot Latin Track Artist of the Year" in the same year she was inducted. Alarcón, Sr. is the first non-recording artist to have been inducted into the Latin Music Hall of Fame. José José, Marco Antonio Solís, and Armando Manzanero have also been recipients of the Lifetime Achievement Award. José José received the Lifetime Achievement in 2013 while Solís was given the award twice, in 2005 and 2016 and Manzaero was presented with the accolade in 2020.

Inductees

See also
Billboard Icon Award
Billboard Latin Music Lifetime Achievement Award
International Latin Music Hall of Fame
Latin Grammy Hall of Fame
Latin Songwriters Hall of Fame
List of halls and walks of fame

References

Hall of Fame
Latin Music Hall of Fame
Latin music awards
Music halls of fame
Halls of fame in Florida
Awards established in 1994
1994 establishments in the United States